Erythrina poeppigiana, called the mountain immortelle, is a species of flowering plant in the genus Erythrina, native to northern and western South America, and introduced to various places in Central America, the Caribbean, Africa, India and tropical Asia. Its striking display of orange flowers has led to its use as an ornamental street tree. It is the emblematic state tree of Mérida, Venezuela. Widely cultivated, it is a nitrogen fixer and a source of fodder.

References

poeppigiana
Plants described in 1901